Overton is a small village in south Shropshire, England.

The B4361 (until 1979 the A49) road runs through. It is in the civil parish of Richard's Castle (Shropshire), the village to its south.

In the Domesday Book it is recorded as the manor of Avretone, which included Richard's Castle. This manor at the time was recorded as belonging to the hundred of Cutestornes, a hundred of Herefordshire. Around the time of Henry I (1100-1139) the hundreds of Shropshire were greatly reformed and the hundred of Munslow was created; this hundred took in Overton.

See also
Listed buildings in Richard's Castle (Shropshire)

References

Villages in Shropshire